Jeffrey David Morenoff (born March 27, 1966) is an American sociologist and professor of sociology at the University of Michigan.

He is also a professor of public policy in the Gerald R. Ford School of Public Policy at the University of Michigan, a research professor at the University of Michigan Institute for Social Research, and the director of the Population Studies Center at the University of Michigan. He is known for researching neighborhood environments, social determinants of health, crime, and social inequality.

Biography
Morenoff joined the faculty of the University of Michigan in 1999. He received his Ph.D. from the University of Chicago in 2000. From 2005 to 2010, he was the associate chair of the University of Michigan's Department of Sociology. He became the director of the Population Studies Center at the University of Michigan on July 1, 2013.

References

External links
Faculty page at the Population Studies Center
Faculty page at the Gerald R. Ford School of Public Policy

Living people
1966 births
University of Michigan faculty
University of Chicago alumni
American criminologists